Yamith Cuesta (born April 17, 1989, in Turbo) is a Colombian footballer.

Career

Club
Cuesta made his debut in the Colombian First Division with Bogota club Santa Fe in 2007, playing 24 matches and scoring two goals.

In 2008, he joined Expreso Rojo in the Colombian Second Division, before being loaned to Major League Soccer side Chivas USA on August 15, 2009. He played in 11 games on a backline that only allowed 11 goals during his first MLS season.

He was released by Chivas USA on February 6, 2011. Chicago Fire acquired his rights in a trade with Chivas USA and immediately signed him on March 23, 2011. His loan deal with Chicago closed at the end of the 2011 season and the club is working to acquire him permanently. Cuesta is known for his strength and tough tackling, as well as his ariel threat. He now plays for Aragua FC.

International
Cuesta has played for the Colombian U-20 national team, and scored the game-winning goal a 1–0 win over Peru, but has never been called up to the senior squad.

References

External links
 

1989 births
Living people
Colombian footballers
Colombia under-20 international footballers
Categoría Primera A players
Independiente Santa Fe footballers
Tigres F.C. footballers
Chivas USA players
Chicago Fire FC players
UB Conquense footballers
América de Cali footballers
Paulista Futebol Clube players
Major League Soccer players
Colombian expatriate footballers
Expatriate soccer players in the United States
Expatriate footballers in Spain
Expatriate footballers in Brazil
Association football defenders
Sportspeople from Antioquia Department